Sos Kondar (also Romanized as Seskandar and Seskondar; also known as Sekandar, Sekander, and Suskandūr) is a village in Baqerabad Rural District, in the Central District of Mahallat County, Markazi Province, Iran. At the 2006 census, its population was 51, in 19 families.

References 

Populated places in Mahallat County